Marun may refer to:

People
 Marun (name)

Places
 Marun, Iran, village
 Marun River, Khuzestan province, Iran
 Marun Field, oil field in Khuzestan province, Iran
 Marun Seh, village Moshrageh District, Iran
 Marun-e Jayezan, village in Jayezan Rural District, Iran
 Mareham le Fen, Lincolnshire, England, a village listed in the 1086 Domesday Book as Marun

Other uses
 Marun petrochemical complex, petrochemical complex in Mahshahr, Khuzestan, Iran
 Marine Unsaturated Model (MARUN)
 Marun, a type of cowbell used in the Chalandamarz Swiss spring festival

See also
 Maruns, a common name of Stellaria media, a flowering plant
 Maron (disambiguation)